Round Harbour was a small settlement in Fortune Bay circa 1864. It is located north west of Harbour Breton.

See also
List of communities in Newfoundland and Labrador

Populated coastal places in Canada
Populated places in Newfoundland and Labrador